Jean Vallière (died 8 August 1523 in Paris) was an Augustinian monk burned at the stake for heresy in 1523 for supporting the teachings of Martin Luther.

See also 
 List of people burned as heretics

References

Year of birth missing
1523 deaths
People executed for heresy
People executed by France by burning
Executed French people
16th-century executions by France